Maximila Imali (born 8 February 1996) is a Kenyan sprinter. She competed in the women's 400 metres at the 2017 World Championships in Athletics. In 2019, she won the bronze medal in the women's 4 × 100 metres relay at the 2019 African Games held in Rabat, Morocco. Imali is among the athletes to shift from competing in the 400m and 800m to the 100m and 200m due to World Athletics' regulations on testosterone levels for athletes with XY disorders of sex development in women's competition.

References

External links
 

1996 births
Living people
Kenyan female sprinters
World Athletics Championships athletes for Kenya
Athletes (track and field) at the 2018 Commonwealth Games
Place of birth missing (living people)
Athletes (track and field) at the 2019 African Games
African Games bronze medalists for Kenya
African Games medalists in athletics (track and field)
Commonwealth Games competitors for Kenya
Intersex sportspeople
Intersex women
Athletes (track and field) at the 2022 Commonwealth Games